Gladiators 2000 is a children's game show and spin-off of American Gladiators. It was hosted by Ryan Seacrest and Maria Sansone (replaced by Valarie Rae Miller in Season 2). Season 5 American Gladiators grand champion Peggy Odita served as head referee.

It premiered on September 17, 1994 and ran until May 11, 1996. This show was co-produced by One World Entertainment then a division of MTV Networks. It was often partnered with its parent show in syndication, although some markets ran it independently. Like AG, the series was produced by Four Point Entertainment, and distributed by Samuel Goldwyn Television. In response to NBC's 2008 revival of American Gladiators, the show was brought back in syndicated reruns for the 2008–2009 television season.

A British version of this show was developed, known as Gladiators: Train 2 Win.

See also
 American Ninja Warrior Junior, the children's edition of American Ninja Warrior

References

External links
 

1994 American television series debuts
1996 American television series endings
1990s American children's game shows
American television spin-offs
First-run syndicated television programs in the United States
Gladiators (franchise)
Television series about children
Television series by MGM Television